Sita Ramam is a 2022 Indian Telugu-language period romantic drama written and directed by Hanu Raghavapudi. Produced by Vyjayanthi Movies and Swapna Cinema, the film stars Dulquer Salmaan, Mrunal Thakur (in her Telugu debut), Rashmika Mandanna and Sumanth. Set in 1964, Lieutenant Ram, an orphaned army officer serving at the Kashmir border, gets anonymous love letters from Sita Mahalakshmi, after which Ram is on a mission to find Sita and propose his love.

Principal photography commenced in April 2021 and ended in April 2022 with filming taking place in Hyderabad, Kashmir and Russia. The film's music was composed by Vishal Chandrasekhar while cinematography by P. S. Vinod and Shreyaas Krishna and editing by Kotagiri Venkateswara Rao.

Sita Ramam released theatrically on 5 August 2022 to generally positive critical reviews. The film emerged as a major commercial success, grossing  crore at the box office, becoming the ninth highest-grossing Telugu film of 2022.

Plot 

In 1964, a Pakistani extremist Ansari expects to break the brotherly bond between Kashmiri Pandits and Muslims using the Indian Army as a pawn through his machination, as a part of which he sends a few brainwashed teenagers to live in Kashmir as its natives. 

In 1985, an aggressive Pakistani rabble-rouser Afreen is demanded by the dean of her university in London to apologize to an Indian philanthropist Anand Mehta for setting his car ablaze in retaliation for burning Pakistani flag. When Afreen repudiates, Mehta asks her to pay a compensation of 10 lakhs INR within a month or else she will be sent to prison. Afreen undertakes an initiative to reconcile with her estranged grandfather Abu Tariq, former Brigadier of Pakistani Army and take money from him. Hence, she flies to Karachi, Pakistan only to learn that he died of illness a few days ago and she, herself is supposed to deliver a letter of Indian Army Lieutenant Ram, written in 1965 to Sita Mahalakshmi of Hyderabad, India which her grandfather could not deliver by means of post. According to Tariq's will, she would inherit his wealth only after the letter is delivered to Sita. Left with no choice, Afreen goes to Noor Jahan Palace, Hyderabad where the letter is intended but realizes that the palace was donated by its princess Noor Jahan for higher education of girls twenty years ago.

Afreen reluctantly enlists the help of her Indian senior Balaji and meets Subramanyam, an accountant who worked at the palace for Nawab for about forty years and inquires about Sita but he doesn't remember anyone with that name employed in the palace. Afreen decides to chase the details about Ram believing that it could lead them to Sita and from a military's library, she collects details about Ram's regiment and meets his regiment-mate Vikas Varma in Anantapuram with Balaji. Vikas narrates to the duo that in 1965, the brainwashed teenagers established themselves as the natives of Kashmir and inadvertently, Ansari leaked their details through a spy to the Indian Army Major Selvan, who ordered Ram's superior Vishnu Sharma to assassinate them despite Ram's protests. After the teenagers, except for one were killed, Ansari triggered a religious riot in Kashmir by provoking Kashmiri Muslims against the Indian Army, accusing the latter of murdering the teenagers and suspecting them just because they were Muslims. Agitated Kashmiri Muslims boycotted the Indian Army and proceeded to burn Agarta, a place where Kashmiri Pandits lived. Ram managed to gather all the Hindus at a safe place along with his regiment mates and by exposing Ansari's conspiracy, cleared the misinterpretation of Muslims causing them to put off the fire and apologize. For their act, Ram and his companions were appreciated and a reporter Vijayalakshmi arrived at their base to interview them. 

Perceiving that Ram was an orphan with none to even write to him, Vijayalakshmi asked everyone on the radio to send their love for Ram, with herself writing a letter to him addressing him as her son. As a result, Ram began to receive several letters while one of them from Sita Mahalakshmi fascinated him. Sita claimed that she was married to Ram and recollected several incidents of their marriage, that never happened. However, there was no sender's address on the letter leaving Ram unaware of who she was and how she looked. While receiving letters regularly from her, Ram figured it out that she would board a train to Hyderabad from Delhi through few details in one of her letters and boarded the same train with Vikas. He eventually found her and recognized her using a riddle she posed for him in a letter, gave her the replies he had written to her letters and left her compartment not before telling her to call the landline of his friend Durjoy Sharma of Hyderabad, with whom he would be staying for next few days. Ram and Vikas unintentionally boarded a train to Madras and hence, it took them some time to reach Hyderabad, where Ram was broken to realize that Durjoy's landline was dead and felt disappointed thinking that he could not meet Sita again. However, she arrived at Durjoy's house searching for Ram asking him to forget her but he refused and she left without telling him who she was. 

Now, Vikas reveals to Afreen and Balaji that he could not meet Ram after that due to his personal problems and gives them Durjoy's address and Vishnu's contact. Afreen makes a phone call to Vishnu through an telephone booth at a bus station but is compelled to disconnect the call as the bus to Hyderabad is about to leave. Curious that someone wants to know about Ram, Vishnu mysteriously postpones his plans to search for Afreen. The latter meets Durjoy and learns what happened after Sita left. 

Ram and Durjoy went for a magic show, which Sita said she wanted Ram to take her to in one of her letters. They successfully managed to find Sita and Ram conversed with her friend Rekha, who disclosed that Sita was the Bharatanatyam teacher to Princess Noor Jahan. Ram and Sita began to spend time with each other and Ram eventually learnt that he rescued Sita from riots in Agarta, that's when she had fallen in love with his benevolent nature. Ram dared to fool the accountant Subramanyam to get into the palace and meet Sita, whom he proposed but she left yet again as something interrupted her from accepting the proposal. Currently, Durjoy gives Afreen and Balaji a photo of Sita which Ram clicked from his camera which Afreen takes to Subramanyam for him to identify her but realizes through a portrait in the palace that Sita is in fact Princess Noor Jahan. 

Afreen and Balaji meet Rekha, who reveals that Noor was in love with Ram but her destiny prevented her from accepting him. As her family's assets in Oman were captured due to the financial crisis, her brother engineered a truce offering to get her married to the Prince of Oman. Rekha advised Noor to divulge about her identity to Ram and she intended to do it by accompanying him to his family, who wrote him letters. However, during those days, Noor felt attached to Ram and could not reveal her identity while left for Kashmir not before expecting Sita to go with him but she could not as the Prince of Oman accepted to marry her. Unbeknownst to them, a journalist Marthandam clicked their pictures and published them in the newspaper publicizing Noor Jahan's affair with a common man. When the Prince of Oman requested for an explanation from Noor through an ambassador, Noor's brother asked her to say that she had nothing to do with Ram but she imparted that she was in love with Ram and was ready to give her property up for him. She left for Kashmir despite receiving opposition from her brother and without passing on about her true identity, she spent a few days with Ram and got acquainted with his colleagues and superiors. Now, Rekha gives Noor's contact to Afreen and Balaji, who learn that she is in Kashmir and leave to meet her over there. Upon landing in Kashmir, Afreen is apprehended by Vishnu who tells her the rest of the story.

Sita and Ram engaged in an unexpected dinner with Vishnu and his wife Vaidehi when the survived Pakistani teenager attempted to murder Vishnu, who was rescued by Ram. Ram convinced the teenager of Ansari's intentions, got to know about his whereabouts and promised the teenager that he would protect his sister Waheeda from Ansari's clutches. Brigadier Y.K. Joshi and Major Selvan assigned Vishnu, Ram and few other officers on a covert mission to assassinate Ansari off the record and declared that the one who wouldn't return would be declared as deserted soldiers of the army. Bidding a tearful bye to Sita who wanted to tell him the truth once he returned, Ram departed for his mission and along with his team, managed to successfully kill Ansari in Pakistan. However, while trying to rescue Waheeda from fire, Ram and Vishnu were arrested by the then-Army General Abu Tariq, who was compassionate towards both of them and requested the Indian diplomat Rahul Varma to trade the Pakistani prisoners in India with Ram and Vishnu. However, the Pakistani Army only wanted to release one of the two and eventually, Vishnu was sent to India at Ram's behest. At present, Vishnu reveals to Afreen that post that incident, Pakistani army orchestrated attacks on Indian Army Bases in Kashmir killing 32 soldiers which made the army to presume that Ram was a traitor and Sita had to bear the humiliation for that misinterpretation. However, Vishnu expresses his trust in Ram and also discloses to Afreen that she is Waheeda, whom Ram tried to protect and because of whom he was separated from Sita. Afreen is devastated. 

Meanwhile, Balaji delivers the letter to Sita, who has been living her life with Ram's memories and through the letters, learns that the Pakistani Army put a condition to Ram and Vishnu that who would reveal the details about Indian Army bases in Kashmir would be released. When Ram refused to, Vishnu gave in to protect Vaidehi and his children from the terrorists. This was why he has been living his life in regret, stopped Afreen and does not want the letter to be delivered to Sita. Sita learns that Ram was executed in the prison through the letter and distraught, she also finds a newspaper clipping attached to it that was published by Marthandam revealing that Ram knew who Sita was but did not care about her religion; such was his love. Sita, through the letter exposes Vishnu causing an inquiry committee to be set up on him and goes to meet Afreen, to whom she reveals that Ram is dead. Afreen blames herself and hugs Sita. While Vishnu shoots himself with his service revolver out of disgrace, Sita receives a medal for Ram's patriotism from the President of India with Afreen restoring his reputation in the army.

Afreen is revealed to have apologized to Mehta and also has 18 prisoners of India released from Pakistan's prison.

Cast 

 Dulquer Salmaan as Lieutenant Ram
 Mrunal Thakur as Princess Noor Jahan alias Sita Mahalakshmi
 Rashmika Mandanna as Afreen alias Waheeda
 Sumanth as Brigadier Vishnu Sharma (formerly Captain)
 Tharun Bhascker as Balaji
 Sachin Khedekar as late Brigadier Abu Tariq (former Army General) of Pakistani Army
 Gautham Vasudev Menon as Major Selvan
 Prakash Raj as Brigadier Y. K. Joshi 
 Shatru as Lieutenant Vikas Varma
 Vennela Kishore as Durjoy Sharma
 Bhumika Chawla as Vaidehi Sharma
 Rukmini Vijayakumar as Prof. Rekha Bharadwaj
 Murali Sharma as Subramanyam
 Ashwath Bhatt as Ansari
 Tinnu Anand as Anand Mehta
 Sunil as Vaaradhi, Train Ticket Examiner
 Priyadarshi Pulikonda as Marthandam
 Rohini as Vijayalakshmi 
 Jisshu Sengupta as Nawab, Noor Jahan's brother
 Abhinaya as Noor Jahan's sister-in-law
 Rahul Ravindran as Rahul Varma
 Pawan Chopra as Pakistani Army General Musa Khan
 Neeraj Kabi as Afreen's family advocate
 Ananth Babu as Seetharamaiah, Subramanyam's colleague
 Goutham Raju as Ticket Collector in train to Madras
 Anish Kuruvilla as Legal Advisor to Noor Jahan's elder brother
 Annapurnamma as House owner
 Praneeta Pattanaik as Radhika, Ram's namesake sister
 Mahesh Achanta as Bharathi, Durjoy's employee
 Geetha Bhascker as Principal of women's college
 Snigdha Bawa as Afreen's roommate
 Nayan Rosh T M as Radio Jockey (Voice)

Production

Development 
Hanu Raghavpudi got the idea for the film when he bought a book that had an unopened inland letter. Regarding the same, he told The Hindu, "The letter I found in that book, in 2007, was from a mother to her son. I gathered that their family is from Vijayawada and the son is living in a hostel. She had enquired about his well-being and asked when he would be home. It got me thinking, what if the contents of the letter had something crucial that could change the course of events?". An army backdrop was later included in the story as suggested by Rajkumar Kandamudi. Sheetal Sharma was brought in as the costume designer for the film. The film was announced in July 2020. In April 2022, its title Sita Ramam was announced.

Casting 
Dulquer Salmaan was roped in to play the lead role as a military officer, and it is his second collaboration in Telugu cinema with Vyjayanthi Movies after Mahanati (2018). In May 2020, Pooja Hegde was approached to play Sita, but she walked out of the film due to date issues. Mrunal Thakur was then signed to play Sita, thus marking her debut in Telugu cinema. Raashi Khanna was initially considered for the role of Afreen before Rashmika Mandanna was finalized for the role.

Filming 
Sita Ramam was initially planned to be simultaneously shot in Telugu and Tamil languages. The song "Kaanunna Kalyanam" was shot first in Telugu and then reshot and added in the Tamil version as "Kannukkule". Principal photography commenced in April 2021 in Kashmir and the first schedule wrapped up in July 2021. After two subsequent schedules in Russia and Hyderabad, the final schedule took place in April 2022.

Music 
The music and soundtrack was composed by Vishal Chandrasekhar. The audio rights were acquired by Sony Music India. The first single titled "Oh Sita Hey Rama" was released on 9 May 2022. "Ala Nemaliki - Inthandam Reprise" version sung by S. P. Charan was released later.

Release

Theatrical 
Sita Ramam released on 5 August 2022 in Telugu along with dubbed versions of Tamil and Malayalam languages. The Hindi dubbed version of the film was released on 2 September 2022.

The film's screening was banned in Bahrain, Kuwait, Oman, Qatar, Saudi Arabia and the United Arab Emirates. According to an article published by News18, the ban was a result of the film hurting religious sentiments. Later, the ban in the United Arab Emirates was lifted and the film released there on 11 August 2022. A pre-release event was conducted in Hyderabad in 3 August 2022 with Prabhas attending as guest. The team promoted the film at events in Hyderabad, Vijayawada, Vizag, Chennai and Kochi.

Distribution 
The film is distributed in Nizam region by Asian Cinemas, Krishna and Uttarandhra region by Annapurna Studios, Tamil Nadu by Lyca Productions and Wayfarer Films in Kerala. The Hindi version rights were acquired by Pen Studios. In the United States, it is distributed by S. Radha Krishna's Radhakrishna Entertainments. The worldwide theatrical rights of the film were sold at a cost of 18.70 crore.

Home media 
The digital distribution rights of the film were acquired by Amazon Prime Video. The film premiered on Amazon Prime Video on 9 September 2022 in Telugu and dubbed versions of Tamil and Malayalam languages. The film premiered on Disney+ Hotstar in Hindi on 18 November, 2022.  The satellite rights of the film is acquired by Star Maa.

Reception

Critical response 

Sita Ramam received generally positive critical reviews upon release, with praise directed towards the direction, story, screenplay, dialogues, soundtrack and performances of the cast. 

Neeshita Nyayapati of The Times of India rated the film 3.5 out of 5 stars and wrote, "With Sita Ramam, Hanu manages to deliver a story that's moving and a film that's visually aesthetic and pleasing". Jayadeep Jayesh of Deccan Herald rated the film 3.5 out of 5 stars and wrote, "Sita Ramam shares its soul with the Bollywood classic Veer-Zaara (2004), yet it maintains an identity of its own". Jeevi of Idlebrain rated the film 3 out of 5 stars and wrote, "On the whole, Sita Ramam is a classy tale of eternal love". Priyanka Sundar of Firstpost rated the film 3 out of 5 stars and called the film "a visually beautiful tale of love and loss". Anji of Sakshi rated the film 3 out of 5 stars, praised the music, cinematography, and direction and called the film 'a beautiful love story'. Soundarya Athimuthu of The Quint rated the film 2.5 out of 5 stars and wrote, "Sita Ramam delivers a poignant love story laced with socio-political messaging". 

Janani K of India Today rated the film 2.5 out of 5 stars and wrote, "Sita Ramam is also a musical, as opposed to a romantic story about war". Balakrishna Ganeshan of The News Minute rated the film 2.5 out of 5 stars and wrote, "Sita Ramam tries hard to make the love story between Sita and Ram a poignant tale, but with weak writing, the film does not get the desired response". He also opined that Vennala Kishore's character is related to Lord Hanuman, who helps Rama in his journey to find Sita in the Ramayanam. Manoj Kumar R. of The Indian Express rated the film 2 out of 5 stars and wrote, "The screen presence of Dulquer Salmaan and Mrunal Thakur does add a little vigour to the otherwise dull narration. The film majorly leverages the good looks of its actors to make it tolerable". Gautama Bhaskaran of News 18 rated the film 1.5 out of 5 stars and wrote, "Sita Ramam has all the ingredients of a puffed-up plot, peppered with coincidences and made to look like a web of implausibilities". 

A critic for Telangana Today stated, "The film is however for the grooming of Dulquer's fan following. He is a natural charmer and understands the nuances of his role". Writing for Hindustan Times, Haricharan Pudipeddi opined, "Dulquer Salmaan and Mrunal Thakur's film is a tale of love that also takes a mature and sensitive take on the conflict between India and Pakistan". Opining the same, The Hindu's Sangeetha Devi Dundoo wrote, "Hanu Raghavapudi's old-world romance saga brims with earnestness and is helped by charming performances from Dulquer Salmaan and Mrunal Thakur". Princy Alexander of Onmanorama, stated, "Sita Ramam is a heartfelt romantic tale in a strife-torn setting". 123Telugu wrote, "On the whole Sita Ramam is a beautiful love story. The film has a decent first half and great second half. The scintillating performances by all the lead cast, the pleasing narrative, and the poetic writing will make you poignant and heartwarming".

Box office 
On the same day, it collected a gross of $400K at the US box office. In nine days, the film has collected a total gross of $1 million at the United States box office. The film collected a worldwide gross of  crore in 10 days, and emerged as a major commercial success at the box office. The film's Hindi version netted  crore at the box office.

Notes

References

External links
 
 

2020s Telugu-language films
Indian romantic drama films
Indian Army in films
2022 romance films
Films shot at Ramoji Film City
Films postponed due to the COVID-19 pandemic
Film productions suspended due to the COVID-19 pandemic
Films shot in Hyderabad, India
Films set in Kashmir
Films shot in Jammu and Kashmir
Films shot in Russia
2022 romantic drama films
Films set in 1965
Films based on Indo-Pakistani wars and conflicts
Films set in 1985
Films scored by Vishal Chandrasekhar
Films set in London